Jin-Me Yoon  (born 1960) is a South Korean-born internationally active Canadian artist, who immigrated to Canada at the age of eight. She is a contemporary visual artist, utilizing performance, photography and video to explore themes of identity as it relates to citizenship, culture, ethnicity, gender, history, nationhood and sexuality.

Yoon's work is known for its use of humour and irony in its visual juxtapositions to the complex subject matter she examines. Her major works include Souvenirs of the Self (1991), a photographic series challenging stereotypical constructs of Canadian identity; A Group of Sixty-Seven (1996), consisting of sixty-seven portraits of Vancouver's Korean Canadian community standing in front of paintings by Lawren S. Harris and Emily Carr; and The Dreaming Collective Knows No History (2006), a video installation exploring the interrelationships of body, city and history.

She received her BA in Psychology from the University of British Columbia in 1985, a BFA from Emily Carr College of Art in 1990, and an MFA from Concordia University in 1992. Currently she lives and works in Vancouver, B.C., and teaches at Simon Fraser University's School for the Contemporary Arts.

Early life 
Jin-me Yoon was born in Seoul, South Korea, to Chung Soon Chin (Jewel) and Myung Choong Yoon (Michael). Her father relocated to Vancouver in 1966 to study pathology, and the rest of the Yoon family joined him in 1968, shortly after the Canadian government ended decades-long immigration restrictions that discriminated on the basis of race. Yoon attended primary school in East Vancouver. During that time, she became fascinated by the photographic images of consumerism she came across in National Geographic, Reader’s Digest, and luxury publications that were available in the waiting room of her father's medical practice. When she was twelve, Yoon began using such images to produce collages. In high school, she learned about art history during visits to temples in Korea and in the Time Life Library of Art that her parents collected, which introduced her to the work of Henri Matisse and Marcel Duchamp. Yoon enrolled at the University of British Columbia (UBC) in 1978 but found the curriculum and its focus on Eurocentric, white, male narratives and creative production to be alienating. After graduating with a BA in Psychology, she earned a BFA from Emily Carr College of Art (now Emily Carr University of Art + Design) in Vancouver (1985–90), which was followed by MFA studies at Montreal’s Concordia University.

Work 
Yoon's works often employ photography, video and elements of performance to question constructions of identity within specific historical and social conditions. In 1991, the artist produced a work entitled Souvenirs of the Self, which explores the relationship between notions of self and Other within dominant images of the Canadian landscape, most noticeably those which have been shaped primarily by tourism. The unconscious, memory, history, identity, place and nationhood are important themes for the artist, whose recent project, Unbidden, uses multiple-channel videos and photographs to allude to the psychic and physical conditions of the subject, particularly through migration, diasporic dispersal and displacement related to war and other geo-political conditions. An installation created in 1998, between departure and arrival, marks Yoon’s shift of using photographic images as outward marker of race. Using video and audio in departure, Yoon investigates "interior, consciousness forming structures such as language."<ref>{{cite book |last1=Radul |first1=Judy |author-link1=Judy Radul |year=1998 |chapter=At the Station: Notes on between departure and arrival' |editor1-last=Yoon |editor1-first=Jin-me |title=Between departure and arrival, 8 January – 8 February 1997 |location=Vancouver, BC |publisher=Western Front Society |page=14 |isbn=9780920974308 |oclc=38430635}}</ref>=

In 2009, she was a finalist for the Art Gallery of Ontario’s Grange Prize  and in 2013 was awarded a Smithsonian Artist Research Fellowship. In 2018 she was made a Fellow of the Royal Society of Canada. In 2022, she won the Scotiabank Photography Award.

Her recent video work explores various cities, most notably in South Korea and Japan. Formally tipping the vertical city of skyscrapers and bipedal humans onto a horizontal plane, Yoon evokes subliminal and inchoate associations with both the past and the present. For viewers experiencing the work within the gallery there is an uncanny sense of a dream-like immersion in the phantasmagoria of late modernity.

Over the past fifteen years her work has become known internationally and was shown 2008 at the Centre Culturel Canadien/Canadian Cultural Centre, Paris, France, Centro Cultural Montehermoso, Vitoria, Spain and Tank Loft in Chongqing, China. Her work has also been recently shown at the Up to/and including the limits, Argos Centre for Art and Media, Brussels, Belgium, Activating Korea, Govett-Brewster Art Gallery, New Plymouth, New Zealand, Videonale, Kunstmuseum Bonn, Germany, the National Gallery of Canada in 2006, Ssamzie Space in Seoul, South Korea in 2006, the Vancouver Art Gallery in 2005 and in many other solo and group exhibitions in North America, Asia, Australia and Europe.

 Select exhibitions About Time, Vancouver Art Gallery (2022)In/Flux: Art of Korean Diaspora, Museum of Vancouver (2018–19)Through the Memory Atlas: 40 Years of Collecting, Kamloops Art Gallery (2018)Radial Change: Beginning with the Seventies, Morris and Helen Belkin Art Gallery, Vancouver (2018)Long View, for LandMarks 2017/Repères 2017Spectral Tides (solo), Nanaimo Art Gallery (2017)AlterNation, Kamloops Art Gallery (2017)Photography in Canada 1960–2000, National Gallery of Canada (2017)Surveying: An Uncertain Landscape, Confederation Centre Art Gallery, Charlottetown (2015)
 Embodied Enactments: Feminist Video Performance in Canada, 1974–2007, Centro Cultural Montehermoso, Vitoria, Spain (2009)
 Passages through Phantasmagoria, Centre Culturel Canadien/Canadian Cultural Centre, Paris (2008)
 Jin-me Yoon: Unbidden (solo), organized and circulated by the Kamloops Art Gallery (2004), touring to Oakville Galleries (2005) Mount St. Vincent University Art Gallery (2005), the National Gallery of Canada, Ottawa (2006–07), and the Southern Alberta Art Gallery, Lethbridge (2007)
 Jin-me Yoon: between departure and arrival Catalogue of an exhibition, the Western Front Gallery, Vancouver (1997)

 Collections 
Yoon's work is in the collections of the Vancouver Art Gallery, Agnes Etherington Art Centre, National Gallery of Canada, Kamloops Art Gallery, Oakville Galleries, Canadian Museum of Contemporary Photography and Walter Phillips Gallery, amongst others.

 Bibliography 
Tiampo, Ming (2022). Jin-me Yoon: Life & Work. Toronto: Art Canada Institute, 2022. 

Zoë Chan, Diana Freundl (Eds.): Jin-me Yoon. About Time'', Hirmer Publishers, Munich 2022,

References

External links

Jin-me Yoon page at the National Gallery of Canada

1960 births
Artists from Vancouver
Canadian people of Korean descent
Canadian performance artists
Women performance artists
Canadian contemporary artists
Canadian photographers
Canadian women artists
Living people
South Korean emigrants to Canada
South Korean contemporary artists
Electronic literature writers